Teekay Petrojarl was the largest Floating Production Storage and Offloading (FPSO) operator in the North Sea with a daily production of 339,000 barrels of oil per day and a storage capacity of  of crude oil. Teekay Petrojarl operated five FPSO vessels, two shuttle tankers and one storage tanker. It was owned by Teekay, a large operator of tankers until purchased by Brookfield Asset Management, becoming Altera Infrastructure.

Operations

History

Teekay Petrojarl started off as Golar Nor Offshore and was part of Petroleum Geo-Services (PGS) in 1998 when it acquired Golar-Nor and two FPSO vessels, Petrojarl I and Petrojarl Foinaven. Within a year two more vessels were delivered Petrojarl Banff and Petrojarl Varg. In 2005 the company acquired the shuttle tanker Rita Knutsen with possibilities for FPSO conversion. In 2007, the Russian tanker Che Guevara was converted into FPSO Petrojarl Cidade de Rio das Ostras by the Polish Remontowa S.A.

Petrojarl ASA was demerged from Petroleum Geo-Services in 2006 and listed on Oslo Stock Exchange in June. Teekay acquired majority ownership in December and Petrojarl ASA became Teekay Petrojarl ASA.

External links

 Teekay Petrojarl web site
 Petroleum Geo-Services web site
 Petroleum Geo-Services 2005 Annual Report

Oil companies of Norway
Companies based in Trondheim
Floating production storage and offloading vessel operators